Lesnikovo is a rural locality (a village) in Posyolok Zolotkovo, Gus-Khrustalny District, Vladimir Oblast, Russia. The population was 399 as of 2010. There are 4 streets.

Geography 
Lesnikovo is located 32 km east of Gus-Khrustalny (the district's administrative centre) by road. Narmoch is the nearest rural locality.

References 

Rural localities in Gus-Khrustalny District